ST9 may refer to:

 ST9, an ST postcode area of the United Kingdom
 the Sarsılmaz Arms ST9, a semi-automatic handgun
 ST9 Enterprise Risk Management exam, of the Institute and Faculty of Actuaries

See also
 Star Trek: Insurrection, the ninth Star Trek film